Montasser AlDe'emeh (Arabic: منتصر يوسف علي الدعمي, romanized: Muntaṣir Yūsuf ʿAlī al-Diʿma; Jordan, April 8, 1989) is a Belgian-Palestinian academic and islamologist.

Biography

Montasser’s parents were both born in Mandatory Palestine. In 1948, his family fled from Sabbarin, a village in the subdistrict of Haifa that was depopulated. The family ended up in the Nur Shams camp, in the northern part of the West Bank. During the Six-Day War in 1967, his family fled to Jordan. In 1991, Two-year-old Montasser, arrived in Molenbeek-Saint-Jean.

Doctoral research

At the KU Leuven he is researching Foreign Terrorist Fighters (FTFs) in Syria. During his doctoral study, he went to Syria to interview fighters from the Al-Nusra Front. In Syria, he got arrested, and interrogated by Al-Nusra. AlDe’emeh tries to help young people turn away from radical ideology. In 2019, he visited the Gweran Prison in Al-Hasakah, where he interviewed Islamic State of Iraq and the Levant prisoners. AlDe’emeh believes there are two profiles of jihadists: the naive idealists and the more violent extremists prepared to strike in their homeland.

Death threats

Montasser’s work has landed him on a ISIS hit list.

References 

Academic staff of KU Leuven

1989 births
Living people
Palestinian emigrants to Belgium